Adam Gierek (pronounced ; born on 17 April 1938 in Zwartberg, Limburg, Belgium) is a Polish politician and Member of the European Parliament (MEP) for the Silesian Voivodship with the Democratic Left Alliance-Labor Union, part of the Socialist Group and sits on the European Parliament's Committee on Industry, Research and Energy. He is a son of Edward Gierek.

Gierek is a substitute for the Committee on Culture and Education, a member of the Delegation to the EU-Kazakhstan, EU-Kyrgyzstan and EU-Uzbekistan Parliamentary Cooperation Committees, and for relations with Tajikistan, Turkmenistan and Mongolia and a substitute for the Delegation to the ACP-EU Joint Parliamentary Assembly.

Education
 1961: Master's in Engineering
 1965: Doctorate
 1968: Assistant professor
 1972: Associate professor
 1978: Professor of technical sciences

Career
 Since 1973: Associate member of the Polish Academy of Sciences (Polska Akademia Nauk)
 1961-1962: Assistant
 1962-1965: Post-graduate doctoral student in Moscow
 1965-1968: Tutor
 1968-1972: Assistant professor
 since 1972: Professor at the Silesian University of Technology
 1969-1972: Head of the foundry institute
 1972-1982: Head of the Metallurgical Sciences and Technology Department, director of the Institute of Materials Engineering
 1982-1989: Visiting professor at the Technische Universität Dresden
 Head of the Department of Materials Technology
 Since 1994: Head of the Department of Technology, Metal Alloys and Composites
 2001-2004: Senator of the Republic of Poland, member of the Committee on Science, Education and Sport
 2001-2003: Member of the Committee on Legislation, Law and Order
 2004: Member of the Committee on Environmental Protection
 Since 1970: Member of the Polish Federation of Engineering Associations (NOT)
 Member of the board of the All-Poland E
 Since 2001: Gierek Association
 Member of the Polish Nuclear Society (PTN) and committees of the Polish Academy of Sciences

Decorations
 Order of the 'Banner of Labour, Second Class', Knight's Cross of the Order of Poland Reborn, Gold Medal of Merit for Defence of the Nation, National Education Medal

See also
 2004 European Parliament election in Poland

External links 
 
 
 

1938 births
Living people
Children of national leaders
Members of the Senate of Poland 2001–2005
Recipients of the Order of the Banner of Work
Polish expatriates in Belgium
People from Limburg (Belgium)
Democratic Left Alliance MEPs
MEPs for Poland 2004–2009
MEPs for Poland 2009–2014
MEPs for Poland 2014–2019